The Virginia–North Carolina League was a  minor league baseball league that played in the 1901 and 1905 seasons, folding before the end of the season in both years. The Virginia-North Carolina League played as a six–team Class C level league in 1901 and as a four–team Class D league in the 1905 season. As the name indicates, the league consisted of teams based in Virginia and North Carolina.

History
In 1901, the Virginia League evolved into the Class C level Virginia–North Carolina League. The Virginia League cities of New Port News Portsmouth and Richmond franchises continued play in the 1901 Virginia–North Carolina League, joining three new franchises.

The new Virginia–North Carolina League began forming in January of 1901. The Virginia cities of Newport News, Norfolk, Portsmouth, and Richmond, Raleigh and Danville, Virginia, were front runners for consideration. Other North Carolina cities of Charlotte, Durham, Greensboro and Wilmington were all also recruited to form teams. Prior to the season, plans for both a ten–team league and an eight–team league were publicly announced. On February 18, 1901, at a meeting at the Monticello Hotel in Norfolk, Virginia, W.H. Cunningham was elected president and E.H. Doran selected as secretary. The league was formed with six teams, four from Virginia and two from North Carolina, with the schedule running from April 15 to September 21. General admission at all sites was set at 25 cents, with grandstands seats at 35 cents. The league employed a single umpire per game, at a salary of $7.00 per game, an amount deemed enough to attract the best umpires.

The Virginia–North Carolina League began play on April 16, 1901 with the six league members Newport News-Hampton Shipbuilders, Norfolk Skippers, Portsmouth Browns, Raleigh Senators, Richmond Bluebirds and Wilmington Giants.

Games early in the season were plagued by rain and other bad weather, including a tornado that hit Newport News, Virginia on May 1, 1901. Attendance was diminished in as a result.

On May 2, 1901, the league took over the Portsmouth Browns franchise, which was suffering from poor attendance. The Newport News–Hampton Shipbuilders (32–26) moved to Charlotte, North Carolina and became the Charlotte Hornets on June 21, 1901, the same day the Portsmouth Browns (22–31) moved to Tarboro to become the Tarboro Tartars.

After the Norfolk Skippers and Richmond Grays franchises disbanded in July, the Virginia–North Carolina League continued play as a four–team league. The league then folded on August 17, 1901. After the league folded, an eleven–game 1901 "championship series" between the first–half champion Wilmington Giants and second–half champion Raleigh Senators was scheduled. After four games, the remainder of the series was cancelled due to numerous rain–outs. Raleigh won all four games played and claimed the league championship. With Charlotte and Greensboro as members, the league essentially evolved into the North Carolina League in 1902, before that league also disbanded on July 15, 1902.

The Virginia–North Carolina League formed again in 1905 as a Class D level league, with help from Jack Grimm, who then became the manager of the Greensboro franchise. The 1905 teams were the Charlotte Hornets, Danville Tobacconists, Greensboro Farmers and Salisbury–Spencer Twins/Winston–Salem Twins. On July 17, 1905, Salisbury-Spencer (24–28) moved to Winston-Salem and became the Winston–Salem Twins. The Virginia–North Carolina League disbanded before the conclusion of the season, stopping play on August 19, 1905 with Danville in 1st place (48–27), followed by Charlotte (40–42), Greensboro (36–47) and Winston-Salem (34–42).

Virginia-North Carolina League teams

Standings & statistics
1901 Virginia–North Carolina League

1905 Virginia–North Carolina League

References

Defunct minor baseball leagues in the United States
Baseball leagues in Virginia
Baseball leagues in North Carolina
Defunct professional sports leagues in the United States
Sports leagues established in 1901
Sports leagues disestablished in 1905